As a nickname, The Jackal may refer to:

People with the nickname 

 Carlos the Jackal (born 1949), Venezuelan-born terrorist 
 Carlos Bocanegra (born 1979), American soccer player
 Carl Frampton (born 1987), boxer from Northern Ireland
 Victoriano Huerta (1850–1916), Mexican military officer and President of Mexico nicknamed "El Chacal" ("The Jackal")
 The Jackal of Nahueltoro (1922–1963), Chilean mass murderer
 The Jackal of Pupunahue (born ca. 1930–?), Chilean mass murderer
 Robin Jackson (1948–1998), Northern Irish terrorist
 Jackal Kaizer or Janove Ottesen (born 1975), Norwegian musician
 Amir Abdullah Khan Niazi (c. 1915–2004), Pakistan Army lieutenant-general nicknamed the "Jackal of Bengal"
 John Purse (born 1972), American former BMX racer
 Guillermo Rigondeaux (born 1980), Cuban boxer nicknamed "El Chacal"
 Andrew Wylie (literary agent) (born 1947), American literary agent

Fictional characters with the nickname 

Sydney Carton, the main character in Charles Dickens' novel, A Tale of Two Cities

See also 

Lists of people by nickname